Two hand-written documents were found in the pockets of murder victim Ricky McCormick when his body was discovered in a field in St. Charles County, Missouri on June 30, 1999. Attempts by the FBI's Cryptanalysis and Racketeering Records Unit (CRRU) and the American Cryptogram Association failed to decipher the meanings of those two coded notes, which are listed as one of the CRRU's top unsolved cases. On March 29, 2011, the U.S. Federal Bureau of Investigation issued an appeal for help from the public in obtaining the meaning of the messages. A few days later, they updated their website to note the "outpouring of responses", and established a separate page where the public can offer comments and theories.

Murder

Victim

Ricky McCormick was a high school dropout who had held multiple addresses in the Greater St. Louis area, living intermittently with his elderly mother. According to a 1999 article in the St. Louis Post-Dispatch, McCormick suffered from chronic heart and lung problems. He was not married, but had fathered at least four children. He had a criminal record, and had previously served 11 months of a three-year sentence for statutory rape. At the time of his death, he was 41 years old, unemployed, and receiving disability welfare payments.

Discovery of body
McCormick's body was found on June 30, 1999, in a cornfield near West Alton, Missouri by a woman driving along a field road near Route 367. Though the body had already somewhat decomposed, authorities used fingerprints to identify McCormick. There was no indication that anyone had a motive to kill McCormick and no one had reported him missing. As such, the authorities initially ruled out homicide; however, no cause of death was officially determined at the time. McCormick was last seen alive five days earlier, on June 25, 1999, getting a checkup at St. Louis' now-defunct Forest Park Hospital.

Description
The two notes found in McCormick's pockets are written in an unknown code consisting of "a jumble of letters and numbers occasionally set off with parentheses" and are believed by the FBI to possibly lead to those responsible for the killing. Dan Olson, chief of the FBI's Cryptanalysis and Racketeering Records Unit, said, illustrating the significance of the notes, "Breaking the code could reveal the victim's whereabouts before his death and could lead to the solution of a homicide." 
Attempts by both the FBI's Cryptanalysis and Racketeering Records Unit (CRRU) and the American Cryptogram Association failed to decipher their meaning, and Ricky McCormick's encrypted notes are currently listed as one of CRRU's top unsolved cases, with McCormick's killer yet to be identified. According to members of McCormick's family, Ricky had used encrypted notes as a boy, but none of them knew how to read the code.

The FBI has had so many responses with suggestions for the cipher that they later requested helpers to not call by phone nor use email. An FBI news release has stated, "This story has generated an outpouring of responses. 
To accommodate the continuing interest in this case, we have established a page where the public can offer their comments and theories about the coded messages."

Criticism
In a 2012 interview with the Riverfront Times, McCormick's family members said, "they never knew of Ricky to write in code. They say they only told investigators he sometimes jotted down nonsense he called writing, and they seriously question McCormick's capacity to craft the notes found in his pockets." His mother, Frankie Sparks, said "The only thing he could write was his name. He didn't write in no code." His cousin, Charles McCormick, said Ricky "couldn't spell anything, just scribble."

Moreover, when McCormick died, officials told his family about the other contents of the victim's pockets, but the family only found out about the notes twelve years later when informed by a local news broadcast.

See also
 Isdal Woman
 List of unsolved murders
 Tamam Shud case
 Zodiac Killer

References

External links
 
  Local news video showing a photo of McCormick, and footage of police at the scene where the body was found
 

1999 documents
1999 murders in the United States
20th-century manuscripts
Crimes in Missouri
Crowdsourcing
Federal Bureau of Investigation
Forensic evidence
Male murder victims
Murder in Missouri
St. Charles County, Missouri
Undeciphered historical codes and ciphers
Unsolved murders in the United States
1999 in Missouri